Leon Vlemmings (born 3 April 1970 in Gemert) is a Dutch football manager and former player.

References

1970 births
Living people
Dutch footballers
Eerste Divisie players
Helmond Sport players
FC Wageningen players
FC Den Bosch players
Dutch football managers
Feyenoord managers
Eredivisie managers
Excelsior Rotterdam managers
People from Gemert-Bakel
Expatriate football managers in Cyprus
FC Eindhoven managers
AEK Larnaca FC managers
Go Ahead Eagles managers
Association football midfielders
Footballers from North Brabant
Dutch expatriate sportspeople in Cyprus